Bambrugge is a sub-municipality of Erpe-Mere in Flanders. It is located on the Molenbeek in the Denderstreek, southeast of East Flanders and belongs to the Arrondissement of Aalst. It is bordered by the sub-municipalities of Vlekkem, Ottergem, Mere, Aaigem and Burst and the municipality of Sint-Lievens-Houtem (sub-municipality Zonnegem). Bambrugge has 1575 inhabitants as of 1 January 2003 and has an area of 2.89 km. The population density is 545 inhabitants / km ². Bambrugge has also a hamlet: Egem.

History
Bambrugge was part of the village Burst until 1803. A census in 1893 reported that the village had 872 inhabitants. Bambrugge was mentioned several times in the Middle Ages. The name probably derives from the so-called banmolens (banmolen meaning compulsion mill). In these mills serfs were obliged to grind their corn. Another possibility is that the name is derived from the word "baan" (baan meaning way or road) or is a corruption of Banbrugge (Bridge of Banno, with brug meaning bridge).

Domain Steenberg
The Romans knew that there was white natural stone in Steenberg in Bambrugge, called Vlaamse Arduin or Lediaanse Steen. This white natural stone was suitable as a foundation for the masonry of Roman villas and as building material for columns and capitals of the Roman temples. By the 11th or 12th century white sandstone was extracted in Bambrugge (Steenberg). Extraction continued until after World War II. It is the administrative center of Erpe-Mere.

Landmarks

Mills 
There are two water mills in Bambrugge, both located on the Molenbeek Brook: the Egemmolen and the Molens Van Sande. The Egemmolen has been largely demolished, but there are still remains of this mill and the mill house intact.

Church and chappelles 

The Sint-Martinus Church can be found in Bambrugge, with Bambrugge belonging to the deanery of Lede. As of 2012 there are still six chapels and a cave in good condition. Previously, there were at least eight chapels, with the two chapels that were not in the possession of the church having been demolished to make room for a house. The old church bell has been preserved and is located in the presbytery of Bambrugge. The former morgue of Bambrugge is renovated in 2012.

Events 
In the week around 26 July there is a fair in Bambrugge and the Saint Anne Statue is carried around in its procession. Each year, the Steenbergcross (cross-country race) and the Molenrock (rock festival) are held at Steenberg in Bambrugge.

Tourism 
Through Bambrugge runs the Molenbeekroute. The Molenbeekroute is a cycle track network, known primarily for the mills of the municipality Erpe-Mere and two brooks that are located there, with both having the name Molenbeek (mill brook).

Sport 
The football club KRC Bambrugge plays in Bambrugge, and is active in the first provincial league of the province of East Flanders.

Sub-municipalities of Erpe-Mere
Populated places in East Flanders